Jamaluddin Roslan (born 18 December 1978) is a Malaysian field hockey player. He competed in the men's tournament at the 2000 Summer Olympics.

References

External links

1978 births
Living people
Malaysian male field hockey players
Olympic field hockey players of Malaysia
Field hockey players at the 2000 Summer Olympics
Place of birth missing (living people)
Commonwealth Games medallists in field hockey
Commonwealth Games silver medallists for Malaysia
Asian Games medalists in field hockey
Asian Games silver medalists for Malaysia
Asian Games bronze medalists for Malaysia
Medalists at the 2002 Asian Games
Medalists at the 2010 Asian Games
Field hockey players at the 2010 Asian Games
Field hockey players at the 2002 Asian Games
Field hockey players at the 1998 Commonwealth Games
2002 Men's Hockey World Cup players
2014 Men's Hockey World Cup players
Medallists at the 1998 Commonwealth Games